The Worcester Farmers were a minor league baseball team that played from 1899 to 1900 in the Eastern League. Under manager Frank Leonard in 1899, they went 58-51, and in 1900 they went 62-63.

They were renamed the Worcester Quakers in 1901 and the Worcester Hustlers in 1902. In 1903, they became the Worcester Riddlers, but the team collapsed during the season and moved to become the Montreal Royals.

References

1899 establishments in Massachusetts
1900 disestablishments in Massachusetts
Baseball teams established in 1899
Baseball teams disestablished in 1900
Farmers
Defunct Eastern League (1938–present) teams
Defunct baseball teams in Massachusetts